Ochrus chapadense is a species of beetle in the family Cerambycidae. It was described by Napp and Martins in 1982. It is found in central Brazil (Mato Grosso, Maranhão).

References

Hesperophanini
Beetles described in 1982